Kisean Paul Anderson (born February 3, 1990), known professionally as Sean Kingston, is an American-Jamaican singer and rapper. He is known for his hit songs "Beautiful Girls", "Fire Burning", "Take You There", and his collaboration with Justin Bieber: "Eenie Meenie".

Early life and education
Born Kisean Paul Anderson in Miami, Florida, Kingston was the first of three children born to Janice Turner. Kingston's family moved to Kingston, Jamaica, when he was six. Kingston attended Ocho Rios High School in Ocho Rios for three years before migrating back to the United States. His grandfather was the noted Jamaican reggae producer Lawrence Lindo, who worked under the stage name Jack Ruby.

Career

2007–2008: Sean Kingston
Kingston was discovered on YouTube by Matt Tobin at Beluga Heights Records, and signed to the label in a partnership deal with Sony. In an interview with HitQuarters label head and producer J. R. Rotem described this process with regards to Kingston:

"Sean Kingston was a rapper when we found him and it was a development process to get him more melodic. At Beluga we essentially refine the talent so that it's more of a marketable product."

In a venture between Epic Records and Koch Records, Kingston recorded and released the single "Beautiful Girls" in May 2007. The song peaked at the top of the Billboard Hot 100. "Beautiful Girls" was a success internationally, topping the charts in Australia, Canada, New Zealand, the Republic of Ireland, Spain and the United Kingdom. In the latter country, the song spent four weeks at the summit of the UK Singles Chart. In 2007, Kingston was the opening act for Gwen Stefani's The Sweet Escape Tour and for select dates on Beyoncé's The Beyoncé Experience tour. In 2008, he was one of the opening acts for the Australian leg of Kelly Clarkson's My December Tour.

2009–2010: Tomorrow

The album Tomorrow was released on September 22, 2009. Producers involved in the album included former Fugee Wyclef Jean; RedOne (of recent Lady Gaga fame); plus Sean's original mentor, J. R. Rotem. "Fire Burning" and "Face Drop" were released as singles. Additionally, five promotional digital singles were released leading up to the album. Kingston co-wrote Jason Derulo's "Whatcha Say". He also found the R&B-reggae singer Iyaz on MySpace and signed him to J. R. Rotem's record label. He also recorded the track "Miss Everything" for the UK girl-group Sugababes studio album Sweet 7 which was released March 15, 2010, in the UK. Kingston and DJ Khaled are being featured on Bow Wow's new single "For My Hood", from the movie, The Lottery Ticket. He had a performance in the O2 Arena where he was supported by Mumzy Stranger.

2010–2013: Back 2 Life, King of Kingz, "Lee Strike" and other projects
The album features T-Pain, Nicki Minaj, Kanye West, Flo Rida, Soulja Boy, Wyclef Jean, Cher Lloyd, Akon, and Green Eyed Tayla. The first single from the album is "Eenie Meenie" featuring Justin Bieber, released on March 23, 2010, which is also included on Bieber's My World 2.0 album. The second single from the album is "Letting Go (Dutty Love)", which features a verse from Nicki Minaj. It was released on iTunes August 3, while the third is "Dumb Love" and was released on iTunes September 8. Sean Kingston's new song "She Moves" samples Irena Cara's "What a Feeling" from the film Flashdance. A fourth single "Party All Night (Sleep All Day)" was released on December 21, 2010.

Kingston represented the continents of North and South America to sing the Official Theme Song of the Singapore 2010 Youth Olympic Games, "Everyone". He collaborated with four other artists representing their continent, South African Jody Williams representing Africa, Singaporean Tabitha Nauser (Asia), Briton Steve Appleton (Europe), and Australian Jessica Mauboy representing Oceania. However, Kingston was unable to attend the Singapore Youth Olympics 2010 opening ceremony due to passport mix-ups. Sean was invited to be featured with Cash Money Records/former So So Def member Bow Wow on his single "For My Hood". He performed the song with Bow Wow and DJ Khaled on BET's television program 106 & Park the day after release.

Kingston planned to release a mixtape with pop star Justin Bieber, called Our World. It featured about 12–14 songs and included their versions of songs like "Pretty Boy Swag", Eagles hit single, "Lyin Eyes" and "Billionaire". The mixtape was completed and Kingston showed his fans a preview on uStream on August 19, 2010. However, the album was never released.  Kingston also went on to perform on the first leg of Bieber's tour. Kingston released his first mixtape, King of Kingz, on February 3, 2011, as a free download only. The mixtape includes guest appearances by Akon, Flo Rida, Soulja Boy, Justin Bieber, B.o.B, and Tory Lanez. Kingston has announced that his new album will be called Back 2 Life. He also said in an interview with MTV that he would be completely re-doing the album and that the previous singles will not be on it. Kingston linked up with T.I. on the set of the video for "Back 2 Life", the street single off his upcoming album of the same name. The two shot the video in Los Angeles with comedian Mike Epps. In November 2012, Kingston performed in the Dubai Caribbean Carnival at Downtown Dubai with Jason Derulo and Bow Wow. On April 13, 2013, iTunes put up the preorder of Back 2 Life, its cover art and track listing as well as a release date of September 10, 2013.

2013–present: Road to Deliverance
In March 2013, Kingston announced plans for his upcoming fourth studio album while stating that he will be recording with Disney and pop star Zendaya. At the same time, he said that they are both recording a song titled "Heart on Empty", which Kingston described as "a soulful ballad that you all will be sure to remember". In November, Kingston also guest-starred, along with Chance the Rapper, Debra Wilson, Erykah Badu, Mel B, Rochelle Jordan, David Alan Grier, and Christopher "Kid" Reid, in the Bob Marley episode of Black Dynamite on Cartoon Network's Adult Swim. In March 2015, Kingston posted on Instagram a picture with Swedish record producer RedOne, confirming that they were working on the album. In May 2015, Sean Kingston posted a snippet of the then-upcoming lead single from his fourth studio album. On September 14, 2015, Kingston premiered his first single in two years titled "Wait Up", the lead single off his upcoming fourth studio album. Music videos were released for "One Away" and "All I Got" in January and March 2016, respectively. In March 2017, he announced the release of the Made in Jamaica mixtape, preceded by the single "Chance" that featured Vybz Kartel.

In 2018, he participated with Italian singer Giusy Ferreri on the vocal part of the single "Amore e capoeira", by Italian record producers Takagi & Ketra.

In 2019, he released his single "Peace of Mind" with rapper Tory Lanez.

In June 2020, he announced the creation of the "Professional Rapper Boxing League" with hip hop super agent, Triple The Mogul.

On May 21, 2021, Kingston returned with the single, "Darkest Times", featuring G Herbo, while also announcing his upcoming fourth studio album.

On December 31, 2021, Kingston participated with Japanese rapper TOMORO on the vocal part of the single "Let Me Hold You".

On September 30, 2022, Road To Deliverance was released as Kingston's fourth studio album.

Personal life

Activism
Kingston filmed a public service announcement with Do Something to encourage teens to become active in their communities by forming a Do Something club. In 2010, he appeared with one of his dogs in an ad for PETA, encouraging people not to chain their dogs outside.

Jet-skiing accident
In May 2011, Kingston was involved in a near-fatal jet skiing accident in Miami, Florida and was immediately rushed to the hospital. Kingston was required to pay a $180 fine for careless operation in the accident. By 2018, he had begun to ride jet skis again.

Discography

 Sean Kingston (2007)
 Tomorrow (2009)
 Back 2 Life (2013)
 Road To Deliverance (2022)

Awards and nominations
 Image Awards
 2008, Outstanding New Artist (Nominated)
 MOBO Awards
 2007: Best Reggae Ever Acts (Win)
 MTV Video Music Awards Japan
 2013: Best Reggae Video "Back 2 Life (Live It Up)" (Nominated)
 Teen Choice Awards
 2007: Choice R&B Track "Beautiful Girls" (Win)
 2007: Choice Summer Track "Beautiful Girls" (Nominated)
 2009: Choice Summer Song "Fire Burning" (Nominated)

References

External links

1990 births
Living people
21st-century American rappers
21st-century American singers
African-American male rappers
African-American male singers
African-American songwriters
American emigrants to Jamaica
American expatriates in Jamaica
American hip hop singers
American male pop singers
American male rappers
American male singers
American male songwriters
American rappers of Jamaican descent
Southern hip hop musicians
Epic Records artists
Jamaican male singers
Jamaican pop singers
Jamaican rappers
Jamaican songwriters
Musicians from Kingston, Jamaica
Musicians from Miami
People from Saint Ann Parish
Rappers from Miami
Reggae fusion artists
Singers from Florida
Songwriters from Florida